Michael John Graydon Soroka (born August 4, 1997) is a Canadian professional baseball pitcher who has played for the  Atlanta Braves of Major League Baseball (MLB) since 2018. A native of Calgary, Soroka graduated from Bishop Carroll High School. He was drafted 28th overall by the Atlanta Braves in 2015, and he spent portions of four seasons in the minor leagues before being called up to the Braves. 

Soroka was an MLB All-Star in 2019, and he finished second in National League Rookie of the Year Award voting. In 2020, he became the Braves' youngest Opening Day starter in the team's modern history, before an injury on August 3 ended his 2020 season.

Early life
Soroka was born on August 4, 1997, in Calgary, Alberta, the son of Gary, a former university and junior hockey player, and Sally Soroka; he has two stepsisters. Soroka's mother died in 2010 of melanoma when he was 12.

He attended Bishop Carroll High School in Calgary, and was a goalie in youth hockey before deciding to concentrate on baseball. He pitched for the junior national team, coached by Chris Reitsma, a fellow Canadian baseball pitcher who was also his mentor. Reitsma has noted Soroka's physical similarity with himself. By his senior year, Soroka has committed to play college baseball for the University of California, Berkeley with scholarship. Prior to the 2015 draft, he was ranked 88th in Baseball America's annual rankings of prospects.

Career

Minor League Baseball
He later reported to the GCL Braves, where he posted a 1.80 ERA in ten innings pitched before being reassigned to the Danville Braves, where he finished the season, going 0–2 with a 3.75 ERA in six starts. Soroka spent the 2016 season with the Rome Braves. There, he posted a 9–9 record with a 3.02 ERA.

Soroka spent 2017 with the Mississippi Braves, posting an 11–8 record with a 2.75 ERA in 153.2 inning pitched. As one of the youngest players in Double-A, Soroka participated in the All-Star Futures Game in July. He began the 2018 season with the Gwinnett Stripers of the Class AAA International League, posting a 1.99 ERA, 0.97 WHIP, 24 strikeouts, and five walks over four starts.

Atlanta Braves

2018: MLB debut
On May 1, 2018, the Braves promoted Soroka to the major leagues. He faced the New York Mets that night, pitching six innings, yielding one run and recording five strikeouts. He began feeling inflammation in his right shoulder after May 12. Soroka brought them forward as being abnormal, and was placed on the disabled list soon thereafter. Rehabilitation in the minor leagues followed throughout June. Because inflammation continued to be a problem, Soroka returned to the ten-day disabled list later that month. On June 27, he was transferred to the 60-day disabled list. In July, it was reported that Soroka would be permitted to begin a throwing regimen by the middle of August. However, in late August, Braves manager Brian Snitker stated that Soroka would miss the remainder of the season. Overall with the 2018 Braves, Soroka registered five  starts, a 2–1 record, 3.51 ERA, and 21 strikeouts in 25 innings pitched.

2019: All-Star and All-MLB team season
Before the 2019 season began, Soroka was expected to be one of several pitching prospects to spend some time in the Braves' starting rotation. During the first week of spring training, Soroka disclosed shoulder discomfort first felt during an offseason workout in January 2019. Soroka maintained that the newly reported discomfort was a right trapezius strain, not an issue with his right scapula, which affected him during his debut season. Soroka was cleared to play catch in mid-March, followed by throwing batting practice. Soroka was sent to minor league camp without appearing in a spring training game. Soroka made his season debut against the Arizona Diamondbacks on April 18, 2019, and became the youngest pitcher in the National League upon taking the mound. When he was placed on the National League Roster for the 2019 Major League Baseball All-Star Game, Soroka set another age-related record, as the youngest Atlanta Braves pitcher to be named an all-star. That year, the Braves became the first team to send two players younger than 22 to the All-Star Game, as both Soroka and Ronald Acuña Jr. received that honor in 2019. In the 2019 season, Soroka registered 29 starts, a 13–4 record, 2.68 ERA, and 142 strikeouts in 174 innings. He was runner-up in NL Rookie of the Year voting to Mets first baseman Pete Alonso, and he placed sixth in NL Cy Young Voting. He was selected to the All-MLB Second Team for that year.

2020: Youngest Opening Day starter for the Braves, injury
Soroka opened the shortened season for the Braves on July 24, 2020, pitching six scoreless innings against the New York Mets, being the youngest Opening Day starting pitcher in the team's modern history, with the age of 22 years and 354 days. On August 3, Soroka unexpectedly tumbled to the ground after throwing his 48th pitch of the game. He began limping and knelt down to await medical attention. Unable to walk off alone, he was helped off the field and left the game. He had torn his Achilles' tendon, prematurely ending his 2020 season. With the 2020 Braves, Soroka registered three starts, a 0–1 record, 3.95 ERA, and eight strikeouts in  innings.

2021–2023: Injuries and rehabilitation
Soroka's salary for the 2021 season was set at $2.8 million after an arbitration hearing. He began the 2021 season on the 60-day injured list in an effort to continue rehab from Achilles surgery he had last year. He had a setback while recovering and was forced to undergo a second surgery on his Achilles. In an interview with MLB Network, Atlanta Braves manager Brian Snitker stated that Soroka would miss the 2021 season. However, Snitker backtracked the next day, saying that Soroka was not out for the season and would be reevaluated in two weeks.

While walking back to the clubhouse on June 24, Soroka suffered a complete re-tear of his Achilles, effectively ending his season. The Braves finished with an 88–73 record, winning the NL East championship and the 2021 World Series, giving the Braves their first title since 1995.

Soroka and the Braves agreed to a contract worth $2.8 million for the 2022 season. After the 2022 season ended, Soroka agreed to another one-year, $2.8 million contract for 2023.

See also

 List of Atlanta Braves Opening Day starting pitchers
 List of Major League Baseball players from Canada
 List of people from Calgary

References

External links

1997 births
Living people
Atlanta Braves players
Baseball people from Alberta
Canadian expatriate baseball players in the United States
Danville Braves players
Gulf Coast Braves players
Gwinnett Stripers players
Major League Baseball pitchers
Major League Baseball players from Canada
Mississippi Braves players
National League All-Stars
Rome Braves players
Sportspeople from Calgary